Inayatullah, also spelled Enayat Ollah etc. is a male Muslim given name and surname composed of the elements Inayat, meaning care and Allah, meaning of God. It may refer to:


Males
Shaikh Inayat Allah Kamboh (1608–1671), Indian scholar, writer and historian
Shah Inayatullah (ca. 1613–ca. 1701), Sindhi revolutionary poet
Qazi Syed Inayatullah (died ca. 1713), scholar of Fiqh from Haryana, India
Inayatullah Khan (1888 –1946), king of Afghanistan
Inayatullah Khan, also known as Allama Mashriqi (1888-1963), Pakistani mathematician, political theorist and Islamic scholar
Sardar Inayatullah Khan Gandapur (1919–2005), Pakistani politician
Enayatollah Reza (1920-2010, Iranian historian and philosopher
Inayat Ollah Khan Niazi (born 1940), Pakistani military officer
Sohail Inayatullah (born 1958), Pakistani-Australian futurologist
Choudhry Inayatullah Pakistani journalist, founder editor of Daily Mashriq
Enayatullah Enayat, Afghan provincial governor
Inayatullah (Guantanamo detainee 10029), Afghan, captured in 2007
Enayat Ullah (born 1992), musician and singer, Pakistan
Inayatullah (editor) (1920 - 1999), Founding editor of Hikayat Digest, Pakistan
Inayat Ullah (wrestler), Pakistani wrestler

Females
Attiya Inayatullah, Pakistani politician

See also 
Inayat Khan (disambiguation)

Arabic masculine given names